Michael Moore (born 20 July 1952) is an English former footballer. A midfielder, he played for Preston North End and Port Vale, but made his name at both Southport and Wigan Athletic. He helped Southport to the Fourth Division title in 1972–73, and also played for Wigan in their first ever season in the Football League. He also enjoyed an extensive non-league career, turning out for eleven different clubs, as well as spending a brief period in the United States with Dallas Tornado.

Career
Moore played youth football for Adlington Rangers and Blackburn Rovers, before becoming an unused squad member for Third Division side Preston North End in 1970–71, during which time he also played on loan for Chorley in the Northern Premier League.

He signed with Southport in 1971, who were then in the Fourth Division. After missing out on the play-offs in 1971–72, the "Sandgrounders" won promotion in 1972–73 as Fourth Division champions. However they were relegated in 1973–74, after which Moore was released.

He spent time with Great Harwood and American side Dallas Tornado, before joining Northern Premier League side Altrincham in 1975. He was soon joined by Great Harwood strike partner Dave Furnival. He hit twenty goals in 45 games in league and cup in 1975–76. His scoring form continued into 1976–77, in which he bagged seventeen goals in 41 games, including a hat-trick against Woking.

He then switched clubs to Wigan Athletic, scoring 11 goals in 29 league games in 1977–78. The club were voted into the Football League after finishing second in the Northern Premier League at the end of the season. However Moore missed the celebrations as he joined Port Vale for a £3,000 fee in March 1978. He played the last thirteen games of the season, but failed to score and was transferred back to Wigan for £2,000 in August 1978.

He scored nine goals in 41 games for the "Latics" in 1978–79, as Wigan posted a sixth-place finish in their first season of league football. Wigan again finished sixth in 1979–80, and Moore returned to non-league circles with Barrow, who were competing in the Alliance Premier League. He later returned to Southport, who had by then lost their league status. He also played for Lytham (on loan), Leyland Motors, Glossop, Chorley, Horwich R.M.I. and Adlington Athletic.

Style of play
Altrincham F.C. historian Terry Rowley described Moore as "a fast, tricky inside forward whose style of play was always going to be a crowd pleaser", and a player that was "instantly recognisable... with his blond hair and red boots."

Career statistics
Source:

Honours
Southport
Football League Fourth Division: 1972–73

References

1952 births
Living people
Sportspeople from Chorley
English footballers
Association football midfielders
Blackburn Rovers F.C. players
Preston North End F.C. players
Chorley F.C. players
Southport F.C. players
Great Harwood F.C. players
Dallas Tornado players
Altrincham F.C. players
Wigan Athletic F.C. players
Port Vale F.C. players
Barrow A.F.C. players
Lytham F.C. players
Leyland Motors F.C. players
Glossop North End A.F.C. players
Leigh Genesis F.C. players
Northern Premier League players
English Football League players
North American Soccer League (1968–1984) players
National League (English football) players
English expatriate footballers
Expatriate soccer players in the United States
English expatriate sportspeople in the United States